Leonidas Lafayette Polk (April 24, 1837 – June 11, 1892), or L.L. Polk, was an American farmer, journalist and political figure. He was a leader of the Farmers' Alliance and helped found the Populist Party.

Life and career
Polk was born in Anson County, North Carolina.  He fought in the American Civil War for the Confederate States of America, and was wounded at the Battle of Gettysburg.

Returning to North Carolina after the war, Polk founded the town of Polkton, incorporated in 1875, where he started a weekly newspaper called The Ansonian.  Through it he advocated for farmers and for the Grange movement.  Polk, a distant relative of President James K. Polk, became active in state politics, serving in the North Carolina House of Representatives and as a delegate to the state constitutional convention in 1865–66.  In 1877, he was appointed the first North Carolina Commissioner of Agriculture and served until 1880.  An agricultural collection he established as Commissioner was the basis for what became the North Carolina Museum of Natural Sciences.

Polk returned to journalism by founding the Progressive Farmer in 1886 in Winston. The magazine is still published to this day.  At first, the paper's primary aim was to teach new agricultural methods, but soon it also focused on politics.

Meanwhile, Polk was also active in the Baptist church, once serving as president of the Baptist State Convention of North Carolina. Polk was instrumental in establishing the North Carolina Agricultural and Mechanical College and Baptist Female University.

In the late 1880s, Polk rose to nationwide prominence through his leadership of the state and national Farmers' Alliance, which had begun in Texas.  He became its national vice president in 1887 and its president in 1889.  These words, spoken in 1887, were typical of Polk's rhetoric: "Our farmers buy everything to raise cotton, and raise cotton to buy everything, and, after going through this treadmill business for years, they lie down and die and leave their families penniless."

The Alliance's mixed record under traditional two-party politics paved the way for the Populist Party, or People's Party.  Polk presided over the meeting in February 1892 that formally created the party.  The Populists likely would have nominated Polk for president in 1892 (see 1892 U.S. presidential election), but he died unexpectedly from a hemorrhaging bladder in Washington, D.C. on June 11, 1892.

Legacy
Polk was one of the first inductees into the North Carolina Agricultural Hall of Fame.

His home in Raleigh is today owned by the state of North Carolina. It was moved on Nov. 12, 2000, to its new location on Blount Street in Raleigh. The Leonidas LaFayette Polk House Foundation plans to use part of the house for the Polk Museum. The rest will be used for state offices.
 The Leonidas L. Polk House was listed on the National Register of Historic Places in 1977.

Polk Hall at North Carolina State University was named in his honor.

References
Notes

Bibliography
Biography from the North Carolina Agricultural Hall of Fame website
Under One Roof, an article from the North Carolina Museum of Natural Sciences website
North Carolina History Project biography
Agricultural Depression. Its Causes—the Remedy, an April 22, 1890 speech by Polk, from a UNC website
Powell, William S. North Carolina: A History. 1988. pp. 173–175.

Further reading
 Noblin, Stuart. "Leonidas Lafayette Polk and the North Carolina Department of Agriculture: Part I: The Genesis of the Department." North Carolina Historical Review 20.2 (1943): 103-121. online

 Noblin, Stuart. "Leonidas Lafayette Polk and the North Carolina Department of Agriculture: Part Ii: Polk as Commissioner of Agriculture." North Carolina Historical Review 20.3 (1943): 197-218.
 Noblin, Stuart. Leonidas LaFayette Polk, Agrarian Crusader (1949)

External links
Guide to the Polk Family Papers 1850-1961
Leonidas L. Polk in the Agricultural Hall of Fame Inductees.
  

North Carolina Commissioners of Agriculture
1837 births
1892 deaths
People from Polkton, North Carolina
Farmers from North Carolina
Burials at Historic Oakwood Cemetery
Confederate States Army soldiers
American publishers (people)
19th-century American newspaper publishers (people)
North Carolina State University people
Members of the North Carolina House of Representatives
Leonidas Lafayette
American agrarianists
Meredith College people
19th-century American journalists
American male journalists
19th-century American male writers
19th-century American politicians